The Irene River is a river of New Zealand, flowing into Charles Sound, Fiordland.

The river flows generally north from the Irene Pass, a saddle in the Museum Range of the Southern Alps. It follows a roughly semicircular path, initially flows northeast before turning north, northwest, and finally west before entering the northern (Emelius) arm of Charles Sound.

See also
List of rivers of New Zealand

References

Rivers of Fiordland